Stephen Ray Wiggins (born 1959) is a Cherokee-American applied mathematician also of British heritage best known for his contributions in nonlinear dynamics, chaos theory and nonlinear phenomena, with applications to Lagrangian aspects of fluid transport and mixing and phase space aspects of theoretical chemistry.

Early life and education
Wiggins was born in Oklahoma City, Oklahoma in 1959, and has two younger siblings. He is enrolled as a member of the Cherokee Nation. He received a BSc in physics and mathematics in 1980 from Pittsburg State University in Pittsburg, Kansas. He has an MA in mathematics and a MSc in physics from the University of Wisconsin-Madison, earned in 1983. He attended Cornell University in Ithaca, New York, where he received his PhD in theoretical and applied mechanics in 1985. He also attended the Open University: Milton Keynes, in Great Britain, where he earned a Bachelor of Laws, with honors, in 2005.

Academic career and field of study
Wiggins received his PhD from Cornell University, where he was influenced heavily by his PhD advisor Philip Holmes. His dissertation was on "Slowly Varying Oscillators." From 1987 to 2001, he was a professor at Caltech. He is actively working on the advancement of computational applied mathematics at the University of Bristol, where he was the head of the Mathematics Department from 2004 until 2008, and was the School Research Director. As of August 2020 Wiggins had 12 PhD students and 60 academic descendants.

Wiggins has contributed in many different areas of applied mathematics, science, and engineering using applied and computational dynamics as the framework for his approach and analysis.

His current focus is on developing the phase space approach to chemical reaction dynamics in the setting of the CHAMPS (Chemistry and Mathematics in Phase Space) project.

Honors
Wiggins received the Presidential Young Investigators Award from the National Science Foundation (NSF) in August 1989.

He was a Stanislaw M. Ulam Visiting Scholar at the Center for Nonlinear Studies, Los Alamos National Laboratory, from 1989 to 1990.

He received the US Office of Naval Research (ONR) Young Investigator Award in Applied Analysis in 1989.

Selected publications
 V.J.García-Garrido; M.Katsanikas; M.Agaoglou; S.Wiggins: Tuning the branching ratio in a symmetric potential energy surface with a post-transition state bifurcation using external time dependence, Chemical Physics Letters, 2020-09: DOI: 10.1016/j.cplett.2020.137714 
 Fang Yang; Yayun Zheng; Jinqiao Duan; Ling Fu; Stephen Wiggins: The tipping times in an Arctic sea ice system under influence of extreme events, Chaos: An Interdisciplinary Journal of Nonlinear Science, 2020-06: DOI: 10.1063/5.0006626

Books
 Global Bifurcations and Chaos -- Analytical Methods. Springer-Verlag Applied Mathematical Science Series. 1988, second printing 1990. 
 Introduction to Applied Nonlinear Dynamical Systems and Chaos. Springer-Verlag textbooks in Applied Mathematics Series, 1990, second printing 1991. Second Edition (expanded) 2003. First edition translated into Japanese. 
 Chaotic Transport in Dynamical Systems. Springer-Verlag Interdisciplinary Applied Mathematical Sciences Series, 1992. 
 Global Dynamics, Phase Space Transport, Orbits Homoclinic to Resonances, and Applications. American Mathematical Society, 1993. 
 Normally Hyperbolic Invariant Manifolds in Dynamical Systems. Springer-Verlag Applied Mathematical Science Series, 1994. 
 Invariant Manifolds and Fibrations for Perturbed Nonlinear Schrödinger Equations (with Y. Li). Springer-Verlag Applied Mathematical Science Series, 1997. 
 Lagrangian Transport in Geophysical Jets and Waves: The Dynamical Systems Approach (with R. Samelson). Springer-Verlag Interdisciplinary Applied Mathematical Sciences Series, 2006. Translated into Russian, 2010. 
 Mathematical Foundations of Mixing: The Linked Twist Map as a Paradigm in Applications Micro to Macro, Fluids to Solids (with R. Sturman and J. M. Ottino). Cambridge University Press, 2006.

Open books
 Elementary Classical Mechanics. figshare. (2017)
 Ordinary Differential Equations. figshare. (2017)
 Solutions to the Exercises in Elementary Classical Mechanics. Figshare. (2018)
 Lagrangian Descriptors: Discovery and Quantification of Phase Space Structure and Transport
 Chemical Reactions: A Journey into Phase Space
 Wiggins, Stephen (2020): Elementary Quantum Mechanics. figshare. Book
 Wiggins, Stephen (2020): Solutions to the Exercises in Elementary Quantum Mechanics. figshare. Book

References

External links
 CHAMPS Project
 Google Scholar
 ORCID

Cornell University alumni
20th-century American mathematicians
21st-century American mathematicians
Living people
20th-century American physicists
21st-century American physicists
Dynamical systems theorists
Chaos theorists
1959 births